The Orange Line (Line 1) is a metro rail line of the Kanpur Metro, a rapid transit system in Kanpur, Uttar Pradesh, India. The priority section of the line was inaugurated on December 28, 2021, by the prime minister of India, Narendra Modi. This line is the first line of the Kanpur Metro to be operationalized. In the first phase, a  section of the route was opened, which is fully elevated. 9 stations were also opened on this priority section of the line as well. The total length of the route will be  of which  will be elevated, and  will be underground. The line will have a total of 21 stations when the entire line is commissioned.

List of stations

See also
Kanpur
Uttar Pradesh Metro Rail Corporation
Uttar Pradesh State Road Transport Corporation
List of rapid transit systems in India
List of metro systems

References

Railway lines opened in 2021
2021 establishments in Uttar Pradesh
Rapid transit lines in India
Kanpur Metro